Chinese Taipei is competing at the 2013 World Championships in Athletics in Moscow, Russia, from 10–18 August 2013.
A team of 7 athletes was announced to represent the country in the event.

Results 
(q – qualified, NM – no mark, SB – season best)

Men

Women

 Athletes in italics did not race.

References

External links
IAAF World Championships 2013 – Chinese Taipei

Nations at the 2013 World Championships in Athletics
World Championships in Athletics
Chinese Taipei at the World Championships in Athletics